This is a list of players who have played at least one game for the Cleveland Barons of the National Hockey League (NHL). This list does not include players for the Minnesota North Stars and the Dallas Stars of the NHL.


Key

Skaters

Goaltenders

See also
List of NHL players

External links
Internet Hockey Database

Cleveland Barons

Barons players